Cypriot Turkish (Kıbrıs Türkçesi) is a dialect of the Turkish language spoken by Turkish Cypriots both in Cyprus and among its diaspora.

History
Emanating from Anatolia and evolved for four centuries, Cypriot Turkish is the vernacular spoken by Cypriots with Ottoman ancestry, as well as by Cypriots who converted to Islam during Ottoman rule. It is understood by expatriate Cypriots living in the UK, United States, Australia and other parts of the world.

Cypriot Turkish consists of a blend of Ottoman Turkish and the Yörük dialect that is spoken in the Taurus Mountains of southern Turkey. In addition, it has absorbed influences from Greek, Italian and English. Cypriot Turkish is mutually intelligible with Standard Turkish.

Since the 1974 Turkish invasion of Cyprus, Turkish is found almost exclusively in Northern Cyprus, with approximately 300,000 native Turkish speakers (including all dialects of Turkish) as of 2016 and 1,400 speakers in the south as of 2013. Of these, a significant number are immigrants from Turkey who do not speak the Cypriot variety of Turkish. Cypriot Turkish is not used officially in the north, where modern standard Turkish became the de facto official language of schools, government, and the media.

Phonology

Differences between standard Turkish and Cypriot Turkish
Cypriot Turkish is distinguished by a number of sound alternations not found in standard Turkish, but some of which are also quite common in other Turkish vernaculars:
 Voicing of some unvoiced stops
 t↔d, k↔g
Standard Turkish  ↔ Cypriot Turkish  "stone"
Standard Turkish  ↔ Cypriot Turkish  "wolf"
Standard Turkish  ↔ Cypriot Turkish  "potato"
 Preservation of earlier Turkic 
Standard Turkish  ↔ Cypriot Turkish  "how are you?"
Standard Turkish  ↔ Cypriot Turkish  "thousand"
Standard Turkish:  ↔ Cypriot Turkish:  "getting in the car"
 Changing 1st person plural suffix
 z↔k
Standard Turkish  ↔ Cypriot Turkish  "we want"
 Unvoicing of some voiced stops
 b↔p
Standard Turkish:  ↔ Cypriot Turkish:  "broad beans"
 Lenition of final affricates
 ç ↔ ş
Standard Turkish  ↔ Cypriot Turkish  "no, none"

The last two alternations are more specific to Cypriot Turkish and are seen less often in other Turkish vernacular.

Consonants

Vowels

Grammar
Cypriot Turkish is structured as a VO language as opposed to standard Turkish which is an OV language. It is very typical in forming a question.
 Standard Turkish  is, in Cypriot Turkish,  ("Will you go to school?")

Cypriot Turkish uses the aorist tense instead of the present continuous tense, and very often in place of the future tense as well.

Cypriot Turkish does not use the narrative/indefinite past, and only uses the simple past instead.
 Standard Turkish  ("He is reported to have gone home") is, in Cypriot Turkish, not used.

This is similar to colloquial Azerbaijani.
 Standard Turkish  ("Is your mother at home?") is, in Cypriot Turkish, 

In Cypriot Turkish, the reflexive pronoun in third person is different, namely  ("him, himself, them, themself"). In Standard Turkish, this would be .

Semantics

Typical question usually do not qualify as standard Turkish questions (see the example above) because question suffixes are usually dropped by native Turkish Cypriots. Another subtle difference is the emphasis on verbs.

See also
 Languages of Cyprus

References

Bibliography

External links
 List of Cypriot Turkish Vocabulary (in Turkish)
 Turkish Cypriot Idioms Search Engine

Turkish language
Turkish, Cypriot
Turkish, Cypriot
Turkish dialects
Subject–verb–object languages

mk:Кипарски Турци